Charles Leon Gilliland (May 24, 1933 – April 25, 1951) was a United States Army soldier who posthumously received the United States military's highest award, the Medal of Honor, for his actions in the Korean War.

Early life
Born in the community of Colfax near Mountain Home, Arkansas, Gilliland was the second of nine children of Leon Carl and Evangeline Margarite Martin Gilliland. His father was a farmer and construction worker and his mother worked as a nurse's aide. His family moved to nearby Marion County when he was a teenager. Throughout his childhood, Gilliland showed a strong interest in the military and law enforcement, enjoyed hunting and fishing, and in his teenage years was a fitness enthusiast. He attempted to enlist in the Marine Corps at sixteen, but was turned away and advised to continue his education. After much convincing, his parents agreed to let him enlist in the U.S. Army on his 17th birthday, May 24, 1950.

Military career
After joining the Army in Yellville, he attended basic training at Fort Riley, Kansas. The Korean War began one month after his enlistment, and by the end of the year he had been sent to east Asia. During his deployment in Korea, he was wounded and, in one instance, carried to safety a fellow soldier who had lost both his legs.

By April 25, 1951, he was a private first class serving with Company I of the 7th Infantry Regiment, 3rd Infantry Division. On that day, near Tongmang-ni, his company came under attack from a numerically superior Chinese force. From his defensive position, Gilliland had a clear view of the defile through which many of the attackers were approaching. Using his automatic rifle, he fired continuously into the defile, even after suffering a severe head wound while chasing down two Chinese soldiers who had breached the defensive line. When orders came to pull back, he voluntarily stayed behind and provided covering fire so that the rest of his unit could withdraw. He was never seen again.

He was posthumously promoted to corporal, and in 1952, recommended for the Medal of Honor. Believing that Gilliland may have been captured by the Chinese, the Army delayed the announcement of the award for fear that he would be punished if his captors learned of his deeds. In 1954, after hostilities had ceased and no sign of Gilliland was found, he was declared dead. The Medal of Honor was formally presented to his family in December of that year during a ceremony at the Pentagon. One month shy of his 18th birthday when he earned the award, Gilliland was the youngest Medal of Honor recipient of the Korean War.

Medal of Honor citation
Gilliland's official citation reads:
Cpl. Gilliland, a member of Company I, distinguished himself by conspicuous gallantry and outstanding courage above and beyond the call of duty in action against the enemy. A numerically superior hostile force launched a coordinated assault against his company perimeter, the brunt of which was directed up a defile covered by his automatic rifle. His assistant was killed by enemy fire but Cpl. Gilliland, facing the full force of the assault, poured a steady fire into the foe which stemmed the onslaught. When 2 enemy soldiers escaped his raking fire and infiltrated the sector, he leaped from his foxhole, overtook and killed them both with his pistol. Sustaining a serious head wound in this daring exploit, he refused medical attention and returned to his emplacement to continue his defense of the vital defile. His unit was ordered back to new defensive positions but Cpl. Gilliland volunteered to remain to cover the withdrawal and hold the enemy at bay. His heroic actions and indomitable devotion to duty prevented the enemy from completely overrunning his company positions. Cpl. Gilliland's incredible valor and supreme sacrifice reflect lasting glory upon himself and are in keeping with the honored traditions of the military service.

See also

List of Korean War Medal of Honor recipients

References

1933 births
1951 deaths
People from Mountain Home, Arkansas
United States Army non-commissioned officers
American military personnel killed in the Korean War
Korean War recipients of the Medal of Honor
United States Army personnel of the Korean War
Military personnel missing in action
United States Army Medal of Honor recipients